The McGavock–Gaines House, also known as Riverside, is a historic mansion in Franklin, Tennessee. It was listed on the National Register of Historic Places in 1988.

Location
The house is located on Caruthers Road, east of the Lewisburg Pike, in Franklin, a small town in Williamson County near Nashville, in the Southern state of Tennessee.

History
The mansion was built circa 1840 for James Randal McGavock, the son of Randal McGavock, who served as the Mayor of Nashville, Tennessee from 1824 to 1825 and owned the Carnton Plantation.

It was remodelled into Classical Revival style in 1902 and renamed as Riverside.  This included adding the house's two-story portico and completely remodeling the interior.

References

Houses on the National Register of Historic Places in Tennessee
Houses in Franklin, Tennessee
Neoclassical architecture in Tennessee
Houses completed in 1840
McGavock family residences
National Register of Historic Places in Williamson County, Tennessee